Luis Viu (born 27 March 1943) is a Spanish alpine skier. He competed in three events at the 1964 Winter Olympics.

References

1943 births
Living people
Spanish male alpine skiers
Olympic alpine skiers of Spain
Alpine skiers at the 1964 Winter Olympics
People from La Massana
20th-century Spanish people